The Oto-Manguean or Otomanguean  languages are a large family comprising several subfamilies of indigenous languages of the Americas. All of the Oto-Manguean languages that are now spoken are indigenous to Mexico, but the Manguean branch of the family, which is now extinct, was spoken as far south as Nicaragua and Costa Rica. Oto-Manguean is widely viewed as a proven language family. However, this status has been recently challenged.

The highest number of speakers of Oto-Manguean languages today are found in the state of Oaxaca where the two largest branches, the Zapotecan and Mixtecan languages, are spoken by almost 1.5 million people combined. In central Mexico, particularly in the states of Mexico, Hidalgo and Querétaro, the languages of the Oto-Pamean branch are spoken: the Otomi and the closely related Mazahua have over 500,000 speakers combined. Some Oto-Manguean languages are moribund or highly endangered; for example, Ixcatec and Matlatzinca each has fewer than 250 speakers, most of whom are elderly. Other languages particularly of the Manguean branch which was spoken outside of Mexico have become extinct; these include the Chiapanec language, which was declared extinct after 1990. Others such as Subtiaba, which was most closely related to Me'phaa (Tlapanec), have been extinct longer and are only known from early 20th century descriptions.

The Oto-Manguean language family is the most diverse and most geographically widespread language family represented in Mesoamerica. The internal diversity is comparable with that of Indo-European, and the Proto-Oto-Manguean language is estimated to have been spoken some time before 2000 BCE. This means that at least for the past 4000 years Oto-Manguean languages have coexisted with the other languages of Mesoamerica and have developed many traits in common with these, to such an extent that they are seen as part of a sprachbund called the Mesoamerican Linguistic Area. However Oto-Manguean also stands out from the other language families of Mesoamerica in several features. It is the only language family in North America, Mesoamerica and Central America whose members are all tonal languages. It also stands out by having a much more analytic structure than other Mesoamerican languages. Another typical trait of Oto-Manguean is that its members almost all show VSO (verb–subject–object) in basic order of clausal constituents.

Overview

History of classification

Internal classification and reconstruction
A genetic relationship between Zapotecan and Mixtecan was first proposed by Manuel Orozco y Berra in 1864; he also included Cuicatec, Chocho and Amuzgo in his grouping. In 1865, Pimentel added Mazatec, Popoloca, Chatino and Chinantec – he also posed a separate group of Pame, Otomi and Mazahua, the beginning of the Oto-Pamean subbranch. Daniel Brinton's classification of 1891 added Matlatzinca and Chichimeca Jonaz to Pimentel's Oto-Pamean group (which wasn't known by that name then), and he reclassified some languages of the previously included languages of the Oaxacan group. In 1920, Walther Lehmann included the Chiapanec–Mangue languages and correctly established the major subgroupings of the Oaxacan group. And in 1926, Schmidt coined the name Otomi–Mangue for a group consisting of the Oto-Pamean languages and Chiapanec–Mangue. The Oto-Pamean group and the Main Oaxacan group were not joined together into one family until Sapir's classification in 1929, where it was included in the Hokan family.

From the 1950s on reconstructive work began to be done on individual Oto-Manguean language groups. Proto-Oto-Pamean was reconstructed by Doris Bartholomew, Proto-Zapotecan by Morris Swadesh, Proto-Chiapanec–Mangue by Fernández de Miranda and Weitlaner. The classification by Campbell 1997 was the first to present a unified view of the Oto-Manguean languages. In 1981, William Merrifield published a reconstruction of the kinship terminologies of each of the Oto-Manguean branches and of Proto-Oto-Manguean. Unpublished reconstructions of Proto-Oto-Manguean grammar have also been made by Terrence Kaufman.

In spite of the lack of a full published reconstruction of proto-Oto-Manguean, the language family has now been widely accepted by specialists, including Lyle Campbell, Terrence Kaufman, and William Poser. Campbell and Poser writing in 2008 concluded that ""Tlapanec-Subtiaba proved not to belong to 'Hokan' as postulated by Sapir (1925a), but to be a branch of Otomanguean ..."" Nonetheless a few studies have retained the inclusion in Hokan, particularly Joseph Greenberg's widely rejected 1987 classification, as well as its derivative works by Merritt Ruhlen. Writing in 1988, Leonardo Manrique still listed Tlapanec-Mangue as an isolated family.

The status of the Amuzgo language as either a part of the Mixtecan group or as forming its own branch from the proto-Oto-Manguean node has been discussed by Longacre, who argued for the latter, but the currently most accepted classification by Campbell (1997) follows Terrence Kaufman in considering Amuzgo to be a branch of Mixtecan. Swadesh (1960) and Rensch included the Huave language as a separate branch within Oto-Manguean, but this inclusion has proved untenable as most of the cognates were loan-words from Zapotec. Huave is now considered an isolate.

Longacre (1968) considered Oto-Manguean to be among the most extensively studied language families of the world, with a level reconstruction rivaling the Indo-European family in completeness, but Kaufman and Justeson (2009) reject this, lamenting the rudimentary reconstruction of Proto-Oto-Manguean lexicon (only c. 350 items have been reconstructed) and grammar. They call for a redoubling of the effort to document and reconstruct several important branches that have received little attention: principally Mixtecan, Popolocan and Oto-Pamean.

Brown (2015) evaluates evidence assembled in support of Oto-Manguean. He points out that vocabulary reconstructed for Proto-Oto-Manguean is not supported by regular sound correspondences. While scholars, including Swadesh, Rensch, and Kaufman, have all reconstructed POM words, none have done so with the benefit of detailed sound correspondences and, consequently Brown argues that their reconstructions as well as Oto-Manguean itself are called into question. Nevertheless, Brown (2015) suggests that Oto-Manguean as Sprachbund (language diffusion area) is a reasonable alternative hypothesis to the proposal of Oto-Manguean as a language family.

Inclusion in macro-family hypotheses
Some early classifications such as that by Brinton, considered that Oto-Manguean languages might be related to Chinese, because like Chinese the languages were tonal and mostly monosyllabic. This idea was quickly abandoned as it was discovered that tonal languages are common, and advances in the historical study of Chinese were made (including the discovery that Old Chinese was non-tonal). Edward Sapir included Subtiaba–Tlapanec in his Hokan phylum, but didn't classify the other Oto-Manguean languages in his famous 1929 classification. In his 1960 classification, Joseph Greenberg considered Oto-Manguean so aberrant from other Native American languages that it was the only accepted family (aside from the Purépecha isolate) which he made a primary branch of his Amerind family. However, in his 1987 revision he linked it with Aztec-Tanoan in a "Central Amerind" branch, apart from Tlapanec which, although it had by then been unequivocally linked to Oto-Manguean, he continued to classify as Hokan. No hypotheses including Oto-Manguean in any higher-level unit have been able to withstand scrutiny.

Prehistory
The Oto-Manguean family has existed in southern Mexico at least since 2000 BCE and probably several thousand years before, some estimates using the controversial method of glottochronology suggest an approximate splitting date of Proto-Otomanguean at c. 4400 BCE. This makes the Oto-Manguean family the language family of the Americas with the deepest time depth, as well as the oldest language family with evidence of tonal contrast in the proto-language.

The Oto-Manguean urheimat has been thought to be in the Tehuacán valley in connection with one of the earliest neolithic cultures of Mesoamerica, and although it is now in doubt whether Tehuacán was the original home of the Proto-Otomanguean people, it is agreed that the Tehuacán culture (5000 BCE–2300 BCE) were likely Oto-Mangue speakers.

The long history of the Oto-Manguean family has resulted in considerable linguistic diversity between the branches of the family. Terrence Kaufman compares the diversity between the main branches of Oto-Manguean with that between the main branches of Indo-European. Kaufman also proposes that Oto-Manguean languages are an important candidate for being the source of many of the traits that have diffused into the other languages in the Mesoamerican linguistic area.

Oto-Mangue speakers have been among the earliest to form highly complex cultures of Mesoamerica: the archeological site of Monte Albán with remains dated as early as 1000 BCE is believed to have been in continuous use by Zapotecs. The undeciphered Zapotec script is one of the earliest forms of Mesoamerican writing.

Other Mesoamerican cultural centers which may have been wholly or partly Oto-Manguean include the late classical sites of Xochicalco, which may have been built by Matlatzincas, and Cholula, which may have been inhabited by Manguean peoples. And some propose an Oto-Pamean presence in Teotihuacán. The Zapotecs are among the candidates to have invented the first writing system of Mesoamerica – and in the Post-Classic period the Mixtecs were prolific artesans and codex painters. During the postclassic the Oto-Manguean cultures of Central Mexico became marginalized by the intruding Nahuas and some, like the Chiapanec–Mangue speakers went south into Guerrero, Chiapas and Central America, while others such as the Otomi saw themselves relocated from their ancient homes in the Valley of Mexico to the less fertile highlands on the rim of the valleys.

Geography and demographics

Western branch

Oto-Pamean

The languages of the Oto-Pamean branch are spoken in central and western Mexico. The group includes the Otomian languages: Otomi spoken primarily in the states of Mexico, Hidalgo, Puebla and Veracruz (c. 293,000 speakers) and Mazahua spoken in the western part of the State of Mexico (c. 350,000 speakers), and the endangered Matlatzincan languages including Matlatzinca (c. 1000 speakers in the town of San Francisco Oxtotilpa) and Tlahuica (also called Ocuilteco) (c. 400 speakers in the municipio of Ocuilan) both spoken in the State of Mexico; And the Pamean group composed of the two living Pame languages of San Luís Potosí, Northern Pame  being spoken in communities from the north of Río Verde on the border with Tamaulipas (c. 5500 speakers), and Central Pame  spoken in the town of Santa María Acapulco (c. 4000 speakers), the extinct Southern Pame language, and the Chichimeca Jonaz language spoken in Misión de Chichimecas near San Luis de la Paz in the state of Guanajuato (c. 200 speakers).

Otomi is traditionally described as a single language, although its many dialects are not all mutually intelligible. The language classification of the SIL International's Ethnologue considers Otomi to be a cover term for nine separate Otomi languages and assigns a different ISO code to each of these nine varieties. Currently, Otomi varieties are spoken collectively by c. 239,000 speakers – some 5 to 6 percent of whom are monolingual. Because of recent migratory patterns, small populations of Otomi speakers can be found in new locations throughout Mexico and in the United States. The Otomi languages are vigorous in some areas, with children acquiring the language through natural transmission (e.g. in the Mezquital Valley of Hidalgo and in the Highlands). However, three varieties are now considered moribund: those of Ixtenco (Tlaxcala state), Santiago Tilapa and Acazulco (Mexico state), and Cruz del Palmar (Guanajuato state). In some municipalities the level of monolingualism in Otomi is as high as 22.3% (Huehuetla, Hidalgo) or 13.1% (Texcatepec, Veracruz). Monolingualism is normally significantly higher among women than among men.

Chinantecan
The Chinantecan languages are spoken by c. 93,000 people in Northern Oaxaca and Southern Veracruz in the districts of Cuicatlán, Ixtlán de Juárez, Tuxtepec and Choapan. The Ethnologue recognizes 14 separate varieties with separate ISO codes.

Tlapanec–Mangue
The Tlapanec language is spoken by c. 75,000 people in Guerrero. There are four principal varieties named after the communities where they are spoken: Acatepec, Azoyú, Malinaltepec and Tlacoapa. Recent labor migrations have introduced Tlapanec speaking communities to the state of Morelos. It was closely related to the Subtiaba language which was spoken in Nicaragua but which is now extinct.

The Manguean languages are all extinct. They included the Mangue and Chorotega languages that were spoken in Nicaragua and Costa Rica at the beginning of the 20th century, and the Chiapanec language which was spoken in Chiapas, Mexico by a handful of speakers in the 1990s, but is now extinct.

Eastern branch

Popolocan
The Popolocan language group includes the seven different varieties of Popoloca which are spoken in southern Puebla state near Tehuacán and Tepexi de Rodríguez (c. 30,000 speakers), and the closely related Chocho language (c. 700 speakers) spoken in Northern Oaxaca state, and the 8 different Mazatecan languages spoken in northern Oaxaca (c. 120,000 speakers), and the nearly extinct Ixcatec language spoken in Santa María Ixcatlán (< 8 speakers). The Popolocan languages should not be confused with the languages called Popoluca spoken in the state of Veracruz, which belong to the unrelated Mixe–Zoquean language family. The Mazatecan languages are known for their prolific use of whistled speech.

Zapotecan

The Zapotecan subgroup is formed by the Zapotec languages (c. 785,000 speakers of all varieties) and the related Chatino languages (c. 23,000 speakers). They are all traditionally spoken in central and southern Oaxaca, but have been spread throughout Mexico and even into the United States through recent labor related migrations.

Zapotec languages and dialects fall into four broad geographic divisions: Zapoteco de la Sierra Norte (Northern Zapotec), Valley Zapotec, Zapoteco de la Sierra Sur (Southern Zapotec), and Isthmus Zapotec.  Northern Zapotec languages are spoken in the mountainous region of Oaxaca, in the Northern Sierra Madre mountain ranges; Southern Zapotec languages and are spoken in the mountainous region of Oaxaca, in the Southern Sierra Madre mountain ranges; Valley Zapotec languages are spoken in the Valley of Oaxaca, and Isthmus Zapotec languages are spoken in the Isthmus of Tehuantepec. The Ethnologue recognizes 57 varieties of Zapotec and 6 varieties of Chatino by distinct ISO codes.

Mixtecan–Amuzgoan

The Mixtecan branch includes the many different, mutually unintelligible varieties of Mixtec spoken by about 511,000 people as well as the Trique (or Triqui) languages, spoken by about 24,500 people and Cuicatec, spoken by about 15,000 people. The Mixtecan languages are traditionally spoken in the region known as La Mixteca, which is shared by the states of Oaxaca, Puebla and Guerrero. Because of migration from this region the Mixtecan languages have expanded to Mexico's main urban areas, particularly the State of México and the Federal District, to certain agricultural areas such as the San Quintín valley in Baja California and parts of Morelos and Sonora, and even into the United States. The Mixtec language is a complex set of regional varieties, many of which are not mutually intelligible. The varieties of Mixtec are sometimes grouped by geographic area, using designations such as those of the Mixteca Alta, the Mixteca Baja, and the Mixteca de la Costa. However, the dialects do not actually follow the geographic areas, and the precise historical relationships between the different varieties have not been worked out. The number of varieties of Mixtec depends in part on what the criteria are for grouping them, of course; at one extreme, government agencies once recognized no dialectal diversity. Mutual intelligibility surveys and local literacy programs have led SIL International to identify more than 50 varieties which have been assigned distinct ISO codes.

Four Amuzgo varieties are spoken in the Costa Chica region of the states of Guerrero and Oaxaca by about 44,000 speakers. The four varieties recognized by the Mexican government are: Northern Amuzgo (amuzgo del norte, commonly known as Guerrero or (from its major town) Xochistlahuaca Amuzgo), Southern Amuzgo (amuzgo del sur, heretofore classified as a subdialect of Northern Amuzgo); Upper Eastern Amuzgo (amuzgo alto del este, commonly known as Oaxaca Amuzgo or San Pedro Amuzgos Amuzgo); Lower Eastern Amuzgo (amuzgo bajo del este, commonly known as Ipalapa Amuzgo). These varieties are very similar, but there is a significant difference between western varieties (Northern and Southern) and eastern varieties (Upper Eastern and Lower Eastern), as revealed by recorded text testing done in the 1970s.

Phonology

Common phonological traits 
All Oto-Manguean languages have tone: some have only two level tones while others have up to five level tones. Many languages in addition have a number of contour tones. Many Oto-Manguean languages have phonemic vowel nasalization. Many Oto-Manguean languages lack labial consonants, particularly stops and those that do have labial stops normally have these as a reflex of Proto-Oto-Manguean .

Tone systems
The Oto-Manguean languages have a wide range of tonal systems, some with as many as 10 tone contrasts and others with only two. Some languages have a register system only distinguishing tones by the relative pitch. Others have a contour system that also distinguishes tones with gliding pitch. Most, however, are combinations of the register and contour systems. Tone as a distinguishing feature is entrenched in the structure of the Oto-Manguean languages and in no way a peripheral phenomenon as it is in some languages that are known to have acquired tone recently or which are in a process of losing it. In most Oto-Manguean languages tone serves to distinguish both between the meanings of roots and to indicate different grammatical categories. In Chiquihuitlan Mazatec which has four tones the following minimal pairs occur: cha1  "I talk", cha2  "difficult", cha3  "his hand" cha4  "he talks".

The language with the most level tones is Usila Chinantec which has five level tones and no contour tones; Trique of Chicahuaxtla has a similar system.

In Copala Trique, which has a mixed system, only three level tones but five tonal registers are distinguished within the contour tones.

Many other systems have only three tone levels, such as Tlapanec and Texmelucan Zapotec.

Particularly common in the Oto-Pamean branch are small tonal systems with only two level tones and one contour, such as Pame and Otomi. Some others like Matlatzinca and Chichimeca Jonaz only have the level tones and no contour.

In some languages, stress influences tone, for example in Pame only stressed syllables have a tonal contrast. In Mazahua the opposite occurs and all syllables except the final stressed one distinguishes tone. In Tlapanec stress is determined by the tonal contour of the words. Most languages have systems of sandhi where the tones of a word or syllable are influenced by other tones in other syllables or words. Chinantec has no Sandhi rules but Mixtec and Zapotec have elaborate systems. For Mazatec some dialects has elaborate Sandhi systems (e.g. Soyaltepec) and others have not (e.g. Huautla Mazatec). Some languages (particularly Mixtecan) also have terrace systems where some tones are "upstep" or "downstep", causing a rise or drop in pitch level for the entire tonal register in subsequent syllables.

Whistled speech
Several Oto-Manguean languages have systems of whistled speech, where by whistling the tonal combinations of words and phrases, information can be transmitted over distances without using words. Whistled speech is particularly common in Chinantec, Mazatec and Zapotecan languages.

Proto-language

Syllable structure
Proto-Oto-Manguean allowed only open syllables of the structure CV (or ). Many modern Oto-Manguean languages keep these restrictions in syllable structure but others, most notably the Oto-Pamean languages, now allow both final clusters and long syllable initial clusters. This example with three initial and three final consonants is from Northern Pame:  "their houses".

Phonemes
The following phonemes are reconstructed for Proto-Oto-Manguean.

Rensch also reconstructs four tones for Proto-Oto-Manguean. A later revised reconstruction by Terrence Kaufman adds the proto-phonemes */ts/, *//, *//, *//, *//, *//, *// and *//, and the vowel combinations */ia/, */ai/, */ea/, and */au/.

The Oto-Manguean languages have changed quite a lot from the very spartan phoneme inventory of Proto-Oto-Manguean. Many languages have rich inventories of both vowels and consonants. Many have a full series of fricatives, and some branches (particularly Zapotecan and Chinantecan) distinguish voicing in both stops and fricatives. The voiced series of the Oto-Pamean languages have both fricative and stop allophones. Otomian also have full series of front, central and back vowels. Some analyses of Mixtecan include a series of voiced prenasalised stops and affricates; these can also be analysed as consonant sequences but it would be the only consonant clusters known in the languages.

These are some of the most simple sound changes that have served to divide the Oto-Manguean family into subbranches:
 to  before vowels in Oto-Pame
 to  before vowels in Oto-Pame and Amuzgo

Lexicon
The following lexical reconstructions of Proto-Oto-Manguean are from Kaufman (1983). The reconstructions are tentative, and are hence marked using two asterisks (**).

{| class="wikitable sortable"
! gloss !! Proto-Oto-Manguean
|-
| to sit || **hku
|-
| to dawn || **(n)xə(n)
|-
| fire; fever || **xi
|-
| three || **hɔ(n)
|-
| to choose || **xʷə
|-
| to blow; to whistle || **xʷi
|-
| ripe || **hwe
|-
| to die || **(h)wə
|-
| flattened; squashed || **(ʔ)ma(h)
|-
| root || **mA
|-
| cloud; dew; rain || **nwa
|-
| to weave || **(n)wa
|-
| to hit || **(n)pah
|-
| bark || **kʷa
|-
| deer || **kʷa
|-
| rabbit || **kVwa
|-
| cocoa beans; edible pod || **kVwa
|-
| cure; medicine; herb || **lya
|-
| road || **lyɔ
|-
| flower || **lih
|-
| salt || **re(n)
|-
| sugar cane || **ro
|-
| eight || **(h)Nye
|-
| two || **(n)yU
|-
| hand || **(n)ya
|-
| teeth || **ʔ(Y)nu
|-
| and || **ʔ(Y)ne
|-
| bad || **cɔ
|-
| grindstone || **ci
|-
| Indian || **sa(n)
|-
| up || **sɔ
|-
| word || **ʔɔn
|-
| turkey hen || **ʔO
|-
| opening || **ʔA
|-
| to bury || **ʔA
|-
| to shake || **(n)pi
|-
| little || **ci
|-
| slowly || **(h,n)wi
|-
| two || **wi
|-
| hard; stone; metal || **kɨ
|-
| to defecate || **tɨ
|-
| butterfly || **seh
|-
| short || **ʔte
|-
| elbow || **me
|-
| early evening; dark || **nə
|-
| eye || **(n)tə
|-
| I || **na
|-
| nopal || **nʔta
|-
| to work || **ʔta
|-
| leaf || **kɔ
|-
| this || **lɔ
|-
| dog || **lyɔ
|-
| net || **nɔ
|-
| fingernail || **-ku
|-
| cornfield || **nu
|-
| water jug || **su
|-
| to close || **ko
|-
| milk || **co
|-
| just, only || **to
|-
| Indian || **Hwi(n)
|-
| to die || **tɨ(n)
|-
| seed || **kyen
|-
| corndough || **l/c-ɔxen
|-
| corncob || **re(n)
|-
| deep || **xən
|-
| ear of corn || **yən
|-
| blood || **yən(h)
|-
| hail || **can
|-
| nine || **Xa(n)
|-
| night, dusk; dream, sleep || **yan
|-
| honeybee || **yɔn
|-
| thorn || **yɔn
|-
| black || **tun
|-
| oven || **tun
|-
| mother || **co(n)
|-
| yellow || **næ
|-
| sing; pray; music || **sæ
|-
| to do || **cæ
|-
| to dance || **tæ
|-
| cactus || **lawæ
|-
| market || **ʔwæ
|-
| to bathe || **sæ
|-
| corn || **sæ(n)ʔ
|-
| skin, bark || **tuwa
|-
| animal || **kiyɔ
|-
| foot || **c/l-a(h)ku
|-
| sharp || **cɪʔyə
|-
| ear || **l/y-ɔkɔ(n)
|-
| blood; meat || **ryi(+)ne
|-
| ixtle || **siya
|-
| guts; heart || **(n)seʔə(n)
|-
| white || **tyuwa
|-
| mouth || **c/l-oʔwɔ
|-
| mountain; cliff || **xeyA
|-
| coyote || **(n)aʔyu
|-
| squash || **lɔken
|-
| cotton || **syi lyɔ
|-
| cotton cloth || **lyɔ tyE
|-
| wide; far; long || **si (n)tU
|-
| infant; small || **weʔ ne
|-
| nose || **syi (n)yɨn
|-
| house; fence; church || **(n)ku ʔwa
|}

Notes

References

External links

Comparative Swadesh vocabulary lists for Oto-Manguean languages (from Wiktionary)
Feist, Timothy & Enrique L. Palancar. (2015). Oto-Manguean Inflectional Case Database. https://oto-manguean.surrey.ac.uk/University of Surrey. doi:10.15126/SMG.28/1
SIL on the Oto-Manguean Stock
 , by Rosemary Beam de Azcona
Feist, Timothy, Matthew Baerman, Greville G. Corbett & Erich Round. 2019. Surrey Lexical Splits Visualisations (Chichimec). University of Surrey. Chichimec verb paradigm visualisations . https://lexicalsplits.surrey.ac.uk/chichimec.html

 
Language families